The 2001 Wallabies Spring tour was a series of matches played in October and November 2001 in Europe by Australia national rugby union team.

The tour was originally to include a test match in Canada, but this was cancelled due a strike by the Canadian players over the sacking of the national coach, David Clark. So two fixtures were added against an England Divisions XV and Oxford University.



Results
Scores and results list Australia's points tally first.''

Touring party
 Head Coach: Eddie Jones

The 30-man touring squad announced in September was:Forwards: 
 Nick Stiles
 Bill Young
 Ben Darwin
 Rod Moore
 Michael Foley
 Brendan Cannon
 David Giffin
 Justin Harrison
 Mark Connors
 Tom Bowman
 Owen Finegan
 Matt Cockbain
 George Smith
 Phil Waugh
 Toutai Kefu
 David Lyons Backs:'''
 George Gregan (captain)
 Chris Whitaker
 Stephen Larkham
 Elton Flatley 
 Manuel Edmonds 
 Nathan Grey 
 Daniel Herbert
 Steve Kefu
 Graeme Bond
 Andrew Walker
 Ben Tune
 Joe Roff
 Matthew Burke
 Chris Latham

References 

 
 
 
 
 
 
 

2001 rugby union tours
2001 in Australian rugby union
2001
2001–02 in European rugby union
2001–02 in Spanish rugby union
2001–02 in English rugby union
2001–02 in French rugby union
2001–02 in Welsh rugby union
Rugby union tours of Spain
Rugby union tours of France
Rugby union tours of England
Rugby union tours of Wales